Bolboparia is an extinct genus of eodiscinid agnostid trilobites. It lived during the late Lower Cambrian in what today Canada and the United States.

Taxonomy 
Bolboparia is most closely related to Acidiscus and slightly more distantly to Stigmadiscus.

Description 
Like all Agnostida, Bolboparia is diminutive and the headshield (or cephalon) and tailshield (or pygidium) are of approximately the same size (or isopygous) and outline. Like all Weymouthiidae, Bolboparia lacks eyes and rupture lines (or sutures). The short, downsloping glabella and the bulging cheeks give it a very peculiar aspect.

Distribution 
 Bolboparia superba and B. elongata are both known from the Lower Cambrian of the United States (unnamed formation, East Chatham Quad, Columbia County, New York State ).
 Bolboparia canadensis is only known from the Lower Cambrian of Canada (Olenellus-zone, calcarenite bed a half mile north of Elgin Station, south shore of the St. Lawrence River in Quebec).

References 

Weymouthiidae 
Agnostida genera
Cambrian trilobites
Fossils of Canada
Fossils of the United States
Paleontology in Quebec